Gregory Lawrence Parkes (born April 2, 1964) is an American prelate of the Roman Catholic Church. Parkes has been serving as the fifth bishop of the Diocese of St. Petersburg in Florida since 2017.  He served as bishop of the Diocese of Pensacola-Tallahassee in Florida from 2012 to 2016.

Early life and education
Gregory  Parkes was born on April 2, 1964, in Mineola, New York. His brother Stephen Parkes is the Bishop of Savannah in Georgia. For primary school, Gregory Parkes attended St. Rose of Lima School in Massapequa, New York.  Parkes graduated from Massapequa High School and attended Daytona Beach Community College in Daytona, Beach, Florida. He earned a Bachelor of Finance degree from Florida State University in Tallahassee, Florida, and worked in banking in Tampa for seven years.

Parkes decided to become a priest after attending morning masses and prayers. He studied for the priesthood at St. Vincent de Paul Regional Seminary in Boynton Beach, Florida.  In 1990, Parkes entered the Pontifical North American College and the Pontifical Gregorian University in Rome, where he received a Bachelor of Theology degree and a Licentiate in Canon Law in 2000.

Priesthood 
On June 26, 1999, Parkes was ordained a priest for the Diocese of Orlando by Bishop Norbert Dorsey. After his ordination, Parkes served as the parochial vicar of Holy Family Parish in Orlando, Florida, from 1999 to 2005.  He was the founding pastor of Corpus Christi Parish in Celebration, Florida, serving there from 2005 to 2012.  Parkes served as chancellor of the diocese from 2005 to 2012.  He became its vicar general in 2009.

Episcopal career

Bishop of Pensacola-Tallahassee

On March 20, 2012, Pope Benedict XVI appointed Parkes as the fifth bishop of the Diocese of Pensacola-Tallahassee.  He attended his first Ad Limina meeting prior to consecration. Parkes was installed and consecrated on June 5, 2012, at St. Paul's Church in Pensacola, Florida.  Archbishop Thomas Wenski was the consecrating prelate.  Bishops John Noonan and Felipe Estévez were the co-consecrators.

Bishop of St. Petersburg
On November 28, 2016, Pope Francis appointed Parkes as bishop of the Diocese of St. Petersburg, succeeding Bishop Robert Lynch.  Parkes was installed at the Cathedral of Saint Jude the Apostle in St. Petersburg on January 4, 2017.  For his pastoral motto, Parkes chose  “To your name give the glory” from Psalm 115, Verse 1. On November 14, 2018, Parkes was elected treasurer of the United States Conference of Catholic Bishops (USCCB).

On October 17, 2018, Parkes and the Diocese of St. Petersburg were named in a sexual abuse lawsuit by Mark Cattell, a Virginia resident.  Cattell alleged that, at age nine, he had been abused in 1981 by Robert D. Huneke, a priest at Christ the King Parish in Tampa.  In 1980, Huneke had sent a letter to the Bishop of Rockville Centre in New York, saying he had abused a boy named John Salveson years earlier in New York.  On August 7, 1981, Salveson, now an adult, had written Bishop William Larkin about Huneke.  Despite Salveson's complaints, the diocese did not removed Huneke from ministry until 1982.

Parkes attended his second Ad Limina visit in 2019. While meeting with Francis, the Pope noticed Parkes' 6'8" height and asked if he played basketball. Parkes started a "View from the Top" podcast, giving an overview of the diocese, and his "Invitation to Worship" podcast, giving a quick overview of the weekly reading.

See also

 Catholic Church hierarchy
 Catholic Church in the United States
 Historical list of the Catholic bishops of the United States
 List of Catholic bishops of the United States
 Lists of patriarchs, archbishops, and bishops

References

External links 

Diocese of Saint Petersburg Official Site

Episcopal succession

1964 births
Living people
People from Mineola, New York
Florida State University alumni
Pontifical North American College alumni
Pontifical Gregorian University alumni
Roman Catholic Diocese of Orlando
21st-century Roman Catholic bishops in the United States
Roman Catholic bishops of Pensacola–Tallahassee